Alexandra Murray Gage, Viscountess Gage (née Templeton; born 1969) is a British academic, businesswoman, and aristocrat. She is a senior lecturer at the University of Brighton, teaching fine art at the university's School of Art and Media. As the second wife of Nicholas Gage, 8th Viscount Gage, she is the châtelaine of Firle Place in Sussex. Lady Gage is the founder and owner of the skincare business Beauty Energy Balms, which makes products from herbs grown in the garden of the Firle estate.

Biography 

Lady Gage married Nicholas Gage, 8th Viscount Gage in 2009 at St Thomas à Becket Church, Framfield in an Anglican ceremony celebrated by Rev. Peter Owen-Jones. They have one son together, The Honourable John Valentine Gage. She is Lord Gage's second wife, as he divorced Lady Diana Adrienne Beatty in 2004, and is thirty-eight years younger than her husband. As the Viscountess Gage, she manages the family estate, Firle Place, which is open to the public four months out of the year. When Firle Place is used for television and filming projects, she and her husband stay at Charleston Farmhouse, another one of their properties.

Lady Gage founded the company Beauty Energy Balms, which makes skincare products from herbs grown in the gardens at Firle Place.

She works at the University of Brighton, as a fine art senior lecturer at the university's School of Art and Media

References 

Living people
1969 births
Academics of the University of Brighton
British cosmetics businesspeople
British viscountesses
British women academics
British women company founders
Alexandra
21st-century British businesswomen